Park Sang-Joon (born 1974) is a male South Korean former international table tennis player.

He won a bronze medal at the 1999 World Table Tennis Championships in the men's doubles with Kim Taek-soo.

See also
 List of table tennis players

References

South Korean male table tennis players
1974 births
Living people
Asian Games medalists in table tennis
Table tennis players at the 1994 Asian Games
Table tennis players at the 1998 Asian Games
Asian Games silver medalists for South Korea
Medalists at the 1994 Asian Games
Medalists at the 1998 Asian Games
World Table Tennis Championships medalists
Universiade silver medalists for South Korea
Universiade medalists in table tennis